Sachindra Chandra Pal  (1942 - 19 May 1961) was an Indian student who took part in the Bengali Language Movement in Silchar and was martyred on 19 May 1961. Sachindra Paul Road in Silchar is named in his memory.

Early life 
Sachindra Chandra born in the village of Madanpur, under Nabiganj police station in the Habiganj sub-division of the undivided Sylhet district in the year 1942, to Gopesh Chandra Pal. He was the second son among six sons and one daughter. During the Partition, their family migrated to Silchar and settled in the town. Sachindra attended the Cachar High School in Silchar and appeared for the secondary examinations in 1961.

Martyrdom 
The very next day after the matriculation exams, a satyagraha was being organized at the Tarapur railway station in Silchar demanding Bengali as the medium of education. Sachindra joined the satyagraha. The rail blockade programme passed off peacefully in the morning. However, in the afternoon at around 2-30 PM, a truck carrying arrested satyagrahis were passing by, when suddenly it was set on fire. When the satyagrahis protested, the military personnel posted at the site started firing indiscriminately killing Sachindra.

See also 
 Kamala Bhattacharya
 Birendra Sutradhar

References 

1942 births
1961 deaths
People from Nabiganj Upazila
People from Cachar district
Martyrs
Bengali Hindus
Bengali Language Movement of Assam activists